Petha (Hindi: पेठा pronounced ) is a translucent soft candy from the Indian subcontinent made from ash gourd or white pumpkin, or simply petha in Hindi and Urdu).

Preparation 
Ash gourds, commonly referred to as white pumpkins, are a vegetable with a pale-green exterior and white, heavily-seeded, savoury inside that is used to make petha. The gourd is sliced into bite-sized pieces and then cured for a few hours in a solution of lime (not the citrus fruit; this is white calcium hydroxide). They boil the gourd pieces until they are soft after removing them from the lime solution, and then they soak them in a flavorful syrup. The final candy has a sugar-crisp exterior and an almost moist, sticky interior with a chewy, crystalline texture. 

The flavouring of Agra's confections is considered to be inventive, and candy counters in the city are rainbows of vibrantly coloured petha flavoured with everything from paan to rose.    

With growing demand and innovation, more varieties of the original preparation are available. Many flavoured variants are available, e.g. kesar petha, angoori petha etc. There are some other variations based on content, one with coconut mixed, another with some nuts put into it. Sometimes kewda essence is used to flavour petha.

History 
Petha is said to have been in the subcontinent in various names like Oal and Oal ka Murabba in places like modern day Jharkhand and Bihar. There is a legend that says that it originated in Mughal kitchens under Shah Jahan and was used to feed the workers constructing the Taj Mahal but it's highly unlikely considering that there is no mention of Petha in cookbooks of Shah Jahan like Nuskha-e-Shahjahani also there are mentions of dishes resembling Petha before Mughals came to subcontinent not to mention it isn't like a typical Mughal sweet and Dishes which were rich in Milk and Mawa.

Controversy 
In Agra, where countless tiny businesses produce different varieties of the treat for  visitors that come to view the Taj every year. When the government designated an 80-kilometer (50-mile) radius around the Taj Mahal as the "Taj Trapezium Zone" and outlawed the use of coal-powered industry in that area, the city's iconic confection became a source of dispute. 

The Taj's white marble, which is readily stained by air pollution, was intended to be protected by the rule, but local petha producers, some of whom use coal to boil their sugar syrup, argued that the law damaged their operations.

Despite the controversy, the sweets are still abundant in bright rows in the sweet shops along the popular tourist route that leads to the Taj's entrance.

See also 

Peda
Mathura peda
 Dōngguā táng or Rock sugar Winter Melon candy

References 

Indian desserts
Confectionery
Agra
Economy of Agra
Uttar Pradeshi cuisine